Kizkala is an abandoned village in the Lori Province of Armenia.

References 

Former populated places in Lori Province